Sari Bolagh (also Romanized as Sārī Bolāgh; also known as Zarybulag) is a village in Peyghan Chayi Rural District, in the Central District of Kaleybar County, East Azerbaijan Province, Iran. At the 2006 census, its population was 38, in 9 families.

References 

Populated places in Kaleybar County